
Bateti Lake is a landslide lake on Batetistskali River located near village Kodmani in the valley of Dzama river, Kareli Municipality, in Shida Kartli region of Georgia, at 1313 metres above sea level. The water area of the lake is only 0.02 km2. Maximal depth is 12 meters.

Fauna 
Lake is habitat of near-threatened species of newt (Ommatotriton ophryticus).

Photo gallery

References

Mountain lakes
Lakes of Georgia (country)